The Alphonse Group belong to the Outer Islands of the Seychelles, lying in the southwest of the island nation,  southwest the capital, Victoria, on Mahé Island. The closest island is Desnœufs Island of the Amirante Islands,  further north.

Islands in the Alphonse Group
Alphonse Atoll in the north, with only one island, Alphonse Island
St. François Atoll in the south, with the islands St. François and Bijoutier

Only Alphonse Island is inhabited.

References

External links
 Alphonse Atoll official website

Outer Islands (Seychelles)